William Bodrugan (died 1362) was an English politician who was MP for an unknown constituency. He was the uncle of William Bodrugan.

References

William
Members of the Parliament of England (pre-1707)
1362 deaths